Emily M. Wicks (born 1985) is an American politician who served as a member of the Washington House of Representatives for the 38th legislative district from 2020 to 2023.

Early life and education 
Wicks was born in Everett, Washington, and raised in Marysville, Washington. She earned a Bachelor of Arts degree in political science and public relations from Washington State University.

Career 
Wick was appointed to the state house in 2020 to fill a vacancy left by June Robinson who had been appointed to fill the seat of retiring state senator John McCoy. On March 21, 2022, Wicks announced she would not seek re-election to the House.

Wicks worked as the communications and community relations coordinator for the Marysville School District. She worked on the 2012 gubernatorial campaign of Jay Inslee and as a legislative aide for then-representative Cyrus Habib. At the time of appointment to the legislature, Wicks was a consultant for non-profits and small government organizations, and served as president of the Washington chapter of the National Women's Political Caucus.

Personal life 
Wicks lives in Everett with her partner, James Day.

References

Democratic Party members of the Washington House of Representatives
Living people
Women state legislators in Washington (state)
Politicians from Everett, Washington
Washington State University alumni
21st-century American politicians
21st-century American women politicians
1985 births